The Momuna–Mek languages are a group of Trans–New Guinea families in central New Guinea established by Timothy Usher, though with precedents in earlier studies.

Languages
The languages of Momuna–Mek are the Mek language family and the Momuna (Somahai) language.

Reconstruction
Usher (2020) reconstructs the consonant and vowel inventories as follows:

{| 
| m || n ||  ||  || 
|-
| p || t ||  || k || kʷ
|-
| b || d ||  || g || gʷ
|-
|  || s ||  ||  || 
|-
| w || l || j ||  || 
|}

{| 
|i|| ||u
|-
|e|| ||o
|-
|ɛ|| ||ɔ
|-
| ||a||ɒ
|}

{| 
|ei||ou
|-
|ɛi||ɔu
|-
|ai||au
|-
|aɛ||aɔ
|}

Only a few of the pronouns have been reconstructed:

{| 
! !!sg!!pl
|-
!1
| *na ||
|-
!2
| *kɒn||
|-
!3
| ||*tun
|}

References

 
Central West New Guinea languages